Sympotthastia is a genus of non-biting midges in the subfamily Diamesinae of the bloodworm family Chironomidae.

Species
The genus includes the following species:

 S. fulva (Johannsen, 1921)
 S. gemmaformis Makarchenko, 1994
 S. huldeni Tuiskunen, 1986
 S. macrocera Serra-Tosio, 1968
 S. repentina Makarchenko, 1984
 S. spinifera Serra-Tosio, 1968
 S. takatensis (Tokunaga, 1936)
 S. zavreli Pagast, 1947

References

Chironomidae